Peter Chamberlen may refer to:

Peter Chamberlen the elder (c. 1560–1631), French-English surgeon and man-midwife
Peter Chamberlen the younger (1572–1626), English surgeon, brother of Peter Chamberlen the elder
Peter Chamberlen the third (1601–1683), English physician, son of Peter Chamberlen the younger

See also
Peter Chamberlin (1919–1978), English architect